The Lang Stane in Hilton, Aberdeen, Scotland is a granite Menhir type standing stone with measurements of approximately 2.95 m in height, 1.5 m in breadth and 0.9 m in thickness at ground level. Its broad face is aligned WNW and ESE.

In the immediate area of Aberdeen there are other standing stones with the same name, such as the Lang Stane at Langstane Place in Aberdeen city centre and the Lang Stane of Auquhollie just south Aberdeen.

References

Megalithic monuments in Scotland
Archaeological sites in Aberdeenshire
Scheduled monuments in Scotland